Earatik Statik is a Chicago based underground Hip Hop group that has been around since 1999. The group consists of two MCs, Sef Rich and Carlos Polk.

Early years
Between 1999 and 2007 they released nine 12 inch vinyl singles on various labels, as well an EP and two CDs,  Lox it Down Suite (2000) produced by Brother El (Lional Freeman) and Feelin Earatik (2005). The Good, the Bad and the Ugly (2009) Feelin Earatik received critical acclaim from top magazines, including four stars in URB.  It was also featured in The Source, Independence Day section, and XXL's Chairman Choice.

Recording history
Earatik Statik has recorded with some of the top names in Hip Hop history, including Sadat X, Diamond D, K-Solo, Ed O.G., Sean Price, Pacewon of the Outsidaz and Kool Keith. They have also released their followup to Feelin Earatik entitled The Good, The Bad and The Ugly, on  March 17 on Gravel Records, which was originally projected for a June 2007 . The album features a production from legendary Hip Hop producer Pete Rock, as well as a remix by Large Professor. It also features verses from Sadat X, Sean Price, Ed O.G. and Tony Benefit. In 2013 they released the single "Big Fire" on Manta Ray Records.

Discography

EPs and singles
"Lox it Down / Stange (12", 1999) Strik9 Records
"Hot Lava / Natural Disaster (12", 2000) Indus Records
"Keep Rockin'" (12", 2003) HeadNock Records
"Stop Playin'" (12", 2003) Tuff Luv Ent
"Evil is Timeless" (12", 2000) Gravel Records
"Alley Rap / Mission Destruction" (12", 2003) Filthy Habits Recordings
"Big Fire" (2013) Manta Ray Records

Appears on
2002 "Evil Is Timeless" (from 0.0.0.CD, Album) Ozone Music
2004 "Get Right" (from Chapter Seven CD, Album) EV Productions
2004 "Get Right"  (from Chapter Seven Album) EV Productions
2004 "It's Our Turn" (from Civil War CD) Molemen Records
2004 "Feels So Good, Before ... (From Now On CD) EV Records
2004 "Feels So Good" (from Session 3 (12") Street) EV Records
2006 "Mission Destruction" (from Collabs Tape 2xCD) Junkadelic Zikmu
2006 "Don't Fuck Wit Us"  (from Don't Fuck Wit Us 12") Wax Work
2007 "Knock Em Out The Box" (from Master P CD, Album) Duck Down Records

References
Earatik Statik's Discography

External links
Earatik Statik's website
Follow Earatik Statik on Twitter
Earatik Statik's latest videos on YouTube
Article on Earatik Statik for WhosWho Chicago

American hip hop groups
Musical groups established in 1999
Musical groups from Chicago
1999 establishments in Illinois